Mala Polana is a village northeast of Velika Polana in the Prekmurje region of Slovenia. Črnec Creek, a tributary of the Ledava, flows past the settlement.

References

External links

Mala Polana on Geopedia

Populated places in the Municipality of Velika Polana